Gensoul is a French surname. Notable people with the surname include:

 Joseph Gensoul (1797–1858), French surgeon
 Justin Gensoul (1781–1848), French playwright and chansonnier
 Marcel-Bruno Gensoul (1880–1973), French admiral

French-language surnames